Friedemann Bach is a 1941 German historical drama film directed by Traugott Müller and starring Gustaf Gründgens, Leny Marenbach and Johannes Riemann. The film depicts the life of Johann Sebastian Bach's son Wilhelm Friedemann Bach. It is based on Albert Emil Brachvogel's novel Friedemann Bach. Wilhelm Friedemann Bach is shown as a gifted son trying to escape his father's shadow.

Plot
During a house concert, the Bach family gets a visit by their son Wilhelm Friedemann, who has just given up his position in Dresden because he no longer could endure the reprisals of his superiors. After he helps his sister Frederike to tell father Johann Sebastian about her
engagement to Johann Christoph Altnikol, the family gets a visit from a messenger of the Saxon Court. Johann Sebastian is asked to take part in a musical competition against French composer Louis Marchand. Johann Sebastian, however, does not want to let his Thomanerchor down and so, he sends Friedemann to Dresden.

Friedemann wins the competition, as Louis Marchand takes flight during Friedemann's performance. Many aristocrats, among whom is Comtesse Antonia Kollowrat, come to Friedemann to be taught in music; Friedemann is ordered by the court to write a ballet. Friedemann and ballet dancer Mariella Fiorini fall in love with each other, which is also due to the influence of Count Graf von Brühl, who has an eye on Antonia. After the ballet is successful, Friedemann is to be appointed court composer. As Antonia criticizes the ballet, Friedemann recognizes that the court's superficiality does not go together with his artistic ambitions. Friedemann and Antonia fall in love with each other. Friedemann promises to find a new position and to get Antonia to join him; his father will surely help him.

However, Johann Sebastian dies. So, Friedemann is confronted with a series of disappointments. Being demanded again and again to play music following his father's style, he finally passes, when applying in Braunschweig, one of his father's early compositions off as one of his own. The truth is discovered, Antonia and Christoph are unable to understand Friedemann, who is frustrated and responds that he no longer wants to be compared with his father Johann Sebastian but wants to be Wilhelm Friedemann Bach.

Embittered, he joins a group of travelling actors who regard him to be as what he is. As Christoph comes after years to see him and tells him that Antonia had been waiting for him in Braunschweig, Friedemann wants to see her again. Antonia, however, has meanwhile married Count Heinrich von Brühl. When Friedemann's group gives a performance in Dresden, the Count arranges that Friedemann and Antonia meet. Although she is still willing to help him, Friedemann shows her his full embitterment; at the Count's behest, Friedemann has to leave Saxony.

Desperately, Friedemann offers one of his father's compositions to a music trader. As one of the trader's client mocks Johann Sebastian Bach, Friedemann starts to argue with the client who hurts Friedemann with a rapier; shortly after, Friedemann dies.

Historical inaccuracy
Wilhelm Friedemann Bach did not die as young as shown in the film.

Cast
Gustaf Gründgens — Wilhelm Friedemann Bach
Eugen Klöpfer — Johann Sebastian Bach
Wolfgang Liebeneiner — Carl Philipp Emanuel Bach
Lina Lossen — Anna Magdalena Bach
Lotte Koch — Friederike Bach
Leny Marenbach — Antonia Kollowrat
Johannes Riemann — Heinrich von Brühl
Camilla Horn — Mariella Fiorini
Hermine Körner — Countess Kollowrat
Gustav Knuth — Christoph Altnikol
Sabine Peters — Charlotte von Erdmannsdorf
Franz Schafheitlin — Sekretär Siepmann
Franz Arzdorf — Kammerherr am königlichen Hof in Dresden
Paul Bildt — Musikalienhändler Lohmann
Ernst Dernburg — Kurfürst August III
Erich Dunskus: Mitglied der fahrenden Theatertruppe
Albert Florath: Gastwirt in Dresden
Eric Helgar: Singender Gast bei Fiorini
Karl Hellmer: Gärtner
Liselotte Schaak: Gemahlin Josepha
Werner Scharf: Baron am Dresdener Hof
Just Scheu: Königlicher Kurier aus Dresden
Alfred Schieske: Wirt in Braunschweig
Heinrich Schroth: Gutsverwalter bei Baron von Sollnau
Wolfgang Staudte: Musiker bei Philipp Emanual Bach
Annemarie Steinsieck: Frau von Erdmannsdorf
Magnus Stifter: Zeremonienmeister des Königs in Dresden
Leopold von Ledebur: Gast bei Fiorini
Otto Wernicke: Kunde im Musikladen
Wolf Trutz: Franz
Walter Werner: Director of the theater troupe
Boris Alekin: Louis Marchand

External links
 

1941 films
1940s historical drama films
German historical drama films
1940s biographical drama films
German biographical drama films
Films of Nazi Germany
1940s German-language films
German black-and-white films
Films about classical music and musicians
Films about composers
Films based on German novels
Films set in the 18th century
Films set in Berlin
Terra Film films
1941 drama films
Cultural depictions of Johann Sebastian Bach